Precis limnoria, the white-spotted commodore, is a butterfly in the family Nymphalidae. It is found in Saudi Arabia, Yemen, Ethiopia, Somalia, Kenya and Tanzania. The habitat consists of savanna and thorn-bush country, especially rocky terrain.

The larvae feed on Asystasia species.

Subspecies
Precis limnoria limnoria — south-western Saudi Arabia, Yemen, Ethiopia, Somalia
Precis limnoria taveta Rogenhofer, 1891 — southern Ethiopia, Kenya, northern Tanzania

References

Butterflies described in 1845
Junoniini